The 2018 France Women's Sevens was the final event of the 2017–18 World Rugby Women's Sevens Series and the third edition of the France Women's Sevens. The tournament was held between 8–10 June 2018 at Stade Jean-Bouin, Paris alongside the men's tournament.

Teams
The eleven core teams will be participating in the tournament, along with one invited team, Wales.

Pool stages
All times in Central European Summer Time (UTC+02:00). The games as scheduled are as follows:

Pool A

Pool B

Pool C

Knockout stage

Challenge Trophy

5th place

Cup

Tournament placings

Source: World Rugby

Players

Scoring leaders

Source: World Rugby

Dream Team
The following seven players were selected to the tournament Dream Team at the conclusion of the tournament:

See also
 2018 Paris Sevens (men)

References

External links
 Tournament page

2018
2017–18 World Rugby Women's Sevens Series
2018 in French women's sport
June 2018 sports events in France
2018 in women's rugby union
2017–18 in French rugby union